Streptomyces marokkonensis is a bacterium species from the genus of Streptomyces which has been isolated from the rhizosphere soil of the tree Argania spinosa in Morocco.

See also 
 List of Streptomyces species

References

Further reading

External links
Type strain of Streptomyces marokkonensis at BacDive -  the Bacterial Diversity Metadatabase

marokkonensis
Bacteria described in 2009